Whitehall is a guest house in Sorrento, Melbourne, Australia. It was built in 1904 from local limestone for the James Dunlop Allen family as accommodation for holiday-makers travelling to the Mornington Peninsula on paddle steamers.

History
During World War II it was made available to families of servicemen by the Royal Australian Navy (RAN). 
They purchased the property  in the summer of 1950 to provide accommodation for families of former Royal Navy men. Several families were already living there, and eventually 70 adults and 30 children will be there permanently. In 1952 the RAN advertised it for sale after paying £31,400. It was purchased by the Dunkley family whose oldest son had just completed service with the British Commonwealth Occupation Force in Japan. In 1983 it was sold to Dr. Ian McGoldrick, who later sold to architect Kevin Greenhatch, the current owner/operator.

Architecture
Whitehall originally had accommodation for around 120 adults in rooms on both the ground and first floor. Most rooms contained a single or double bed and a set of drawers and wardrobe. Bathrooms were communal, with a men's and women's on each level. The first floor rooms facing Back Beach Road had windows onto the full-length balcony. A narrow passageway between rooms provided verandah access to all guests. Downstairs, the rooms facing the road were larger. They like those above them, had fireplaces. At either end of the ground floor was the lounge room and the billiard room, both with fireplaces. The dining room and ballroom shared the transept, perpendicular to the rest. At the rear, under a separate roofline was the kitchen, servery, laundry, staff eating area, preparation area, store rooms and refrigeration including a cool room replete with solid wooden door with a long metal lever arm to press the door closed ensuring an airtight seal. Outside were several wooden garages, a workshop, a room housing a potato-peeling machine, and washing mops. Behind them stands a limestone row of rooms used up until the 1970s as sleeping quarters for male staff. In the 1960s the Dunkleys built female staff quarters parallel to the men's, set into the hill.

Limestone is a soft material, easily worn away by wind and rain. To prevent deterioration to the southern wall, the national park next door was planted out with pines and cypress. These were removed after 40 years in a campaign to remove all indigenous plants throughout Australia.

References

External links
 WHITEHALL GUESTHOUSE

Buildings and structures in the Shire of Mornington Peninsula
Sorrento, Victoria
1904 establishments in Australia
Buildings and structures completed in 1904
Hotels in Melbourne